The Twenty-Four Protective Deities or the Twenty-Four Devas (Chinese: 二十四諸天; pinyin: Èrshísì Zhūtiān), sometimes reduced to the Twenty Protective Deities or the Twenty Devas (Chinese: 二十諸天; pinyin: Èrshí Zhūtiān), are a group of dharmapalas in Chinese Buddhism who are venerated as defenders of the Buddhist dharma. The group consists of devas, naga kings, vajra-holders and other beings, mostly borrowed from Hinduism with some borrowed from Taoism.

Overview

In historical Indian Buddhism, there were originally sixteen devas who were considered as dharmapalas. These devas, such as Shiva, Indra and Brahma, were originally deities from early Hinduism and the Vedas who were syncretized into Indian Buddhism. However, more deities, namely Surya, Chandra, Yama and Sāgara, were later added to form a group of twenty. At a later date, the Kinnara King was also added. Upon Buddhism's arrival in China, it became syncretized with the native culture. Three Taoist gods, namely the Emperor Zi Wei, Emperor Dongyue and the Thunder God, were added to the grouping as well, forming the modern list of twenty-four deities.

Veneration of the twenty-four deities has continued into modern Chinese Buddhist traditions. In Chinese Buddhist temples and monasteries, statues of the deities are mostly enshrined in the Mahavira Hall, or a temporary altar to the twenty-four devas are erected outside the threshold, pointed toward the heavens. A puja called the "Gōngfó Zhāitiān" (供佛齋天) or just "Zhāitiān" (齋天), meaning "Offering to Buddhas and Celestial Guardians", where the twenty-four deities are venerated (but not worshipped), is customarily performed in Chinese Buddhist temples on the 9th day of the 1st month of the Chinese calendar, commemorating the traditional feast day of the Jade Emperor of Taoism. This ceremony was started during the Sui dynasty by Zhiyi of the Tiantai tradition according to the rites prescribed in the Golden Light Sutra and has been carried down through tradition to the present day. In some temples, the three syncretized Taoist deities as well as the Kinnara King are excluded from the list and the remaining devas are venerated as the Twenty Protective Deities (Chinese: 二十諸天; pinyin: Èrshí Zhūtiān).

List of the Twenty-Four Deities

The list of deities consist of Maheśvara (Shiva), Brahma, Indra, Lakshmi, Saraswati, the Four Heavenly Kings, Surya, Chandra, Guhyapāda, Pañcika, Skanda, Prthivi, Spirit of the Bodhi Tree, Hārītī, Mārīcī, Sāgara, Yama, the Kinnara King, Emperor Zi Wei, Emperor Dongyue and the Thunder God (Leigong).

Maheśvara (Shiva) 
In Chinese, he is known as Dàzìzàitiān (大自在天), meaning "Great self-existent deva", as well as Móxīshǒuluótiān (摩醯首羅天), which is a Chinese transcription of "Maheśvara" in Sanskrit. Originally from Hinduism, he is considered the ruler of the three realms. He is described under two forms, one as the prince of demons, the other as a divine Bodhisattva.  As a Piśāca, head of the demons, he is represented in Buddhist iconography with three eyes and eight arms, and riding on a white bull; a bull or a linga being his symbol. As a Śuddhāvāsa, or Pure dwelling, he is described as a bodhisattva of the tenth or highest degree, on the point of entering Buddhahood.

Brahma 
In Chinese, he is known as Dàfàntiān (大梵天), meaning "Brahma-deva", and Sìmiànshén (四面神), meaning "Four-faced god". While he is considered to be the creator god in Hinduism, he is not regarded as such in Buddhism, which rejects the notion of any creator deities. In Buddhist iconographic form, he is often portrayed as a man dressed in traditional Chinese Emperor robes and crown. In another iconographic form, he is portrayed as riding on a swan and as having four faces and four arms. One arm holds a lotus flower, one arm holds nianzhu (prayer beads), one arm holds a water vase and one arm forms a mudra.

Śakra (Indra) 
In Chinese, he is known as Dìshìtiān (帝釋天). Originally from Hinduism, he is considered the ruler of Trāyastriṃśa and sometimes conflated with the Jade Emperor in Chinese folk religion. In Buddhist iconographic form, he is portrayed in traditional Chinese Emperor robes and crown. Behind his figure stands three female attendants, one holding an umbrella, one holding Mount Meru and one sitting within a Nelumbo nucifera.

Lakshmi 
In Chinese, she is known as Jíxiáng Tiānnǚ (吉祥天女), meaning "Auspicious Goddess", as well as Gōngdétiān (功德天), meaning "Meritous Deva". Originally from Hinduism, she is considered the goddess of wealth. In Buddhist iconographic form, based on her description in the Golden Light Sutra, she usually holds the cintāmaṇi jewel in her left hand and forms a mudra with her right hand. Her mantra, the Sri Devi Dharani (Chinese: 大吉祥天女咒; pinyin: Dà Jíxiáng Tiānnǚ Zhòu) is classified as one of the Ten Small Mantras (Chinese: 十小咒; pinyin: Shí xiǎo zhòu), which are a collection of dharanis that are commonly recited in Chinese Buddhist temples in during morning liturgical services.

Saraswati 
In Chinese, she is known as Biàncáitiān (辯才天), meaning "Eloquent Devī", and Miàoyīntiān (妙音天), meaning "Devī of Wonderful Sounds". Originally from Hinduism, she is considered the goddess of knowledge and music as well as the sister of Yama. In Buddhist iconographic form, based on her description in the Golden Light Sutra, she is portrayed as having eight arms, one holding a bow, one holding arrows, one holding a knife, one holding a lance, one holding an axe, one holding a pestle, one holding an iron wheel, and one holding ropes. In another popular Buddhist iconographic form, she is portrayed as sitting down and playing a pipa, a Chinese lute-like instrument.

Vaiśravaṇa 
In Chinese, he is known as Duōwén Tiānwáng (多聞天王), meaning "Heavenly King who listens to many teachings" in reference to the belief that he guards the place where the Buddha teaches and hence listens to many of the Buddhist teachings, as well as Píshāméntiān (毗沙門天), which is a Chinese transcription of his name in Sanskrit. He is regarded as one of the Four Heavenly Kings who guards the north. In Buddhist iconographic form, he holds a pagoda in his right hand and a trident in his left hand.

Virūḍhaka 
In Chinese, he is known as Zēngzhǎng Tiānwáng (增長天王), meaning "Heavenly King of growth" in reference to his ability to teach sentient beings to grow in compassion, as well as Bílóulèchā (毘楼勒叉), which is a Chinese transcription of his name in Sanskrit. He is regarded as one of the Four Heavenly Kings who guards the south. In Buddhist iconographic form, he is usually colored green or blue and brandishes a sword.

Dhṛtarāṣṭra 
In Chinese, he is known as Chíguó Tiānwáng (持國天王), meaning "Heavenly King who holds a country" in reference to the belief that he can help support a country against enemies, as well as Títóulàizhā (提頭頼吒), which is a Chinese transcription of his name in Sanskrit. He is regarded as one of the Four Heavenly Kings who guards the east. In Buddhist iconographic form, he holds a pipa.

Virūpākṣa 
In Chinese, he is known as Guăngmù Tiānwáng (廣目天王), meaning "Heavenly King with broad eyes" in reference to the belief that he is very far-sighted, as well as Bílóubóchā (毘楼博叉), which is a Chinese transcription of his name in Sanskrit. He is regarded as one of the Four Heavenly Kings who guards the west. In Buddhist iconographic form, he holds a red naga or a red lasso in his hands.

Surya 
In Chinese, he is known as Rìtiān (日天) or Rìgōng Tiānzǐ (日宮天子). Originally from Hinduism, considered the sun god. In Buddhist iconographic form, he holds a lotus flower in his hands. He sits in a chariot drawn by eight horses with two female attendants at his side. In another popular iconographic form, he is dressed in the robes and cap of a Chinese minister and holds the sun in his hands.

Chandra 
In Chinese, he is known as Yuètiān (月天) or Yuègōng Tiānzǐ (月宮天子). Originally from Hinduism, considered the moon god. In Buddhist iconographic form, he bears the full moon on his crown. On the moon, there is a jade rabbit. In another popular iconographic form, he is dressed in the robes and cap of a Chinese minister and holds the moon in his hands.

Guhyapāda 
In Chinese, he is known as Mìjī Jīngāng (密跡金剛) or Jīngāng Mìjī (金剛密跡) both meaning "The Vajra-being of Secret Traces". He is a vajra-holding protector deity from Buddhist scripture. In Buddhist iconographic form, he wields a vajra mallet "vajra-pāṇi" (a diamond club, thunderbolt stick, or sun symbol) and bares his teeth. His mouth is depicted as being open to form the "ha" or "ah" sound, which is the beginning character of the vocalization of the first grapheme of Sanskrit Devanāgarī (ॐ ) representing the word Om. In Chinese folk religion and Taoism, he is also known as General Ha (哈将 Hā Jiāng) in reference to this iconographic detail. In Chinese Buddhist temples, his statue is usually built opposite that of another Vajra-holding god (who is known as Nārāyaṇa) and the pair usually stand guarding temple entrance gates called Shānmén (山門). In Chinese Buddhist belief, the two vajra-wielders Guhyapāda and Nārāyaṇa are manifestations of the bodhisattva Vajrapani.

In addition, Guhyapada is also sometimes paired or identified with the Wisdom King Ucchuṣma, who is commonly known as Huìjì Jīngāng (穢跡金剛). In a thirteenth-century Chinese long gāthā elaborating on the two major scriptures relating to Ucchusama, the Huiji Jin’gang Shuo Shentong Daman Tuoluoni Fashu Lingyao Men (穢跡金剛說神通大滿陀羅尼法術靈要 門經; lit "The Scripture of the Numinous and Essential Gate to the Ritual Techniques of the Great Perfection Dhāraṇī of Supernatural Power as Spoken by the Vajra-being of Impure Traces"; T. 1228), and the Huiji Jin’gang Jin Baibian Fajing (穢跡金剛禁百變法經; "The Scripture of the Rites of the Vajra-being of Impure Traces for Binding the Hundred Transformations"; T. 1229), Ucchuṣma’s Chinese name Huìjì Jīngāng was changed to Mìjī Jīngāng due to negative connotations associated with the former name. In the Chongbian Zhutian Zhuan ( 重編諸天傳; lit "Recompiled Biographies of Devas and Devīs") from the Southern Song period, one of the Sanskrit transliterations given for Guhyapāda is Ucchuṣma. In a repentance ritual for the Śūraṅgama Sūtra, both Guhyapāda and Ucchusama were invoked as a pair. The two wrathful deities were also sometimes found standing opposite each other at the entrances of some monasteries.

Pañcika 
In Chinese, he is known as Sànzhī Dàjiàng (散脂大將). Originally from Hinduism, he is regarded as a yaksha and consort of Hārītī, whom he is often portrayed as standing next to in temple statues and iconography. He is also sometimes regarded as one of the Eight Great Yakṣa Generals under the command of Vaiśravaṇa. In Buddhist iconographic form, he bears a demonic face with fangs in his mouth and fire emerging from his eyes.

Skanda 
In Chinese, he is known as Wéituó Tiān (韋馱天) or Wéituó Púsà (韋馱菩薩), which is a corrupted form of his original Chinese name Jiàntuó Tiān (建陀天) or Jiàntuó Púsà (建陀菩薩), which in turn is a Chinese transcription of his name in Sanskrit. Originally regarded as a god of war in Hinduism, he is viewed as either a protective deva or as a Bodhisattva in Chinese Buddhism. His Buddhist iconography has been syncretized with Chinese elements to a large extent, so he is commonly depicted as wearing traditionary Chinese military armor and wielding a Chinese sword. According to a legend, a few days after the Buddha's passing and cremation, evil demons stole his tooth relic. In response, Wéituó made a vow to protect the Buddhist Dharma and followed it up by defeating the evil demons and returning the relics. In Chinese Buddhist Temples, he is often enshrined together with his counterpart, Sangharama (personified as the historical general Guan Yu), protecting a third statue of a Buddha or a Bodhisattva.

Pṛthvī 
In Chinese, she is known as Dìtiān (地天), meaning "Earth Devī", or Jiānláo Dìshén (堅牢地神) and Jiānláo Dìtiān (堅牢地天), both meaning "Firm earth goddess". Originally from Hinduism, she is considered a goddess of the earth and one of the four beings wielding thunderbolts in the Diamond Realm of Chinese Esoteric Buddhism. In Buddhist iconographic form, she has either four or two arms and wields a flower vase and farming tools in her hands.

Spirit of the Bodhi Tree 
In Chinese, she is known as Pútí Shùshén (菩提樹神). She is regarded as a goddess who guards the Bodhi Tree or a manifestation of the tree itself. In Buddhist iconographic form, she holds branches of the Bodhi tree in her hands.

Hārītī 
In Chinese, she is known as Guǐzǐmǔ (鬼子母). Originally from Hinduism, considered a demon consort of Pañcika who was converted to Buddhism by the Buddha. Considered a protector deity of children. According to Buddhist legends, Hārītī was originally a rākṣasī of Rajgir at the same time that Gautama Buddha also lived there. She had hundreds of children of her own, whom she loved and doted upon, but to feed them, she abducted and killed the children of others. The bereaved mothers of her victims pleaded to the Buddha to save them. So, the Buddha stole the most beloved of her sons, and hid him under his rice bowl. After having desperately searched for her missing son throughout the universe, Hārītī finally appealed to the Buddha for help. The Buddha pointed out that she was suffering because she lost one of hundreds of children, and asked if she could imagine the suffering of parents whose only child had been devoured. She then repented and vowed to protect all children. In doing so, Hārītī became regarded as the protector of children and women in childbirth. In Chinese Buddhist iconographic form, she is often portrayed as standing with a child or several children or as holding a child in her arm.

Mārīcī 
In Chinese, she is known as Mólìzhītiān (摩利支天). She is sometimes regarded as a goddess and sometimes regarded as a Bodhisattva. In Chinese Buddhism, she is sometimes considered an incarnation of the Bodhisattva Cundī, with whom she shares similar iconography. She is also worshiped as the goddess of light and warfare and as the guardian of all nations, whom she protects from the fury of war. In addition, she is also identified with Mahēśvarī (Parvati), the consort of Maheśvara, and therefore has the title Mātrikā (佛母 Fo mǔ), Mother of the Myriad Buddhas. In Buddhist iconographic form, she has eight arms, each holding different types of weapons, and rides on a chariot drawn by eight boars. In another iconographic form, she is portrayed sitting down holding a fan. In Chinese folk religion and Taoism, she is sometimes identified as the goddess Doumu (Chinese: 斗母元君; pinyin: Dǒumǔ Yuánjūn), who is the personification of the Big Dipper as well as the feminine aspect of the cosmic God of Heaven.

Sāgara 
In Chinese, he is known as Suōjiéluó Lóngwáng (娑竭羅龍王). In Chinese Buddhism, he is regarded as one of the Eight Dragon Kings who presides over the world's supply of rain, as well as one of sixteen Nāga that are spared from the assault of the garudas. He is also regarded as one of the Twenty-Eight Guardian deities of the thousand-armed manifestation of the Bodhisattva Guanyin. In some Mahayana sutras, his palace is said to lie at the bottom of the ocean and is 84,000 yojanas in length and width with an array of decorations that are seven-fold, including walls, banisters, jeweled nets and seven rows of trees. The palace is adorned with the seven treasures and is filled with the song of innumerable birds.

Yama 
In Chinese, he is known as Yanluo Wang (閻羅王) or Yánmóluówáng (閻摩羅王). Originally from Hinduism, he is considered as one of the Ten Kings of Hell who judges the souls of the dead in a court in the realm of the underworld. In Buddhist iconographic form, he is usually portrayed as a large man with a scowling red face, bulging eyes, and a long beard. He wears traditional judge robes and a judge's cap or a crown which bears the character for "king" (王). He has also been syncretized into Taoism and Chinese folk religion as a god of the dead as well, performing largely the same functions as his Chinese Buddhist counterpart.

Kinnara King 
In Chinese, he is known as Jǐnnàluó Wáng (緊那羅王). In Buddhist iconographic form, depicted as either male or female. The male form has a horse head with a male body. Some Buddhist also venerates him as their Kitchen God as an equivalent to the traditional Taoist Zao Jun. In the Shaolin tradition, he is conflated with Vajrapani (in his manifestation as Nārāyaṇa) and is identified as an avatar of the Bodhisattva Guanyin, who manifested to defend the Shaolin monastery from bandits during the Yuan-era Red Turban Rebellion.

Emperor Zi Wei 
In Chinese, he is known as Zǐwēi Dàdì (紫微大帝). Originally from Taoism, he is a personification of the North Star and considered to be the keeper of the book of destiny as well as a dispeller of demons who is revered for his power to ward off evil influences and spirits. In one iconographic form, he is portrayed as a standard Chinese official sitting on a throne. In another iconographic form, he is portrayed as a youth astride or sitting side-saddle atop a reclining mythical beast, holding a conch in his hands and dressed in trousers and a cape and wearing a tiara from which two objects, like insect feelers, project upwards.

Emperor Dongyue
In Chinese, he is known as Dōngyuè Dàdì (東嶽大帝). Originally from Taoism, he is regarded as a god who resides at Mount Tai and judges what realm of Saṃsāra a person will be reborn in. He is also believed to be the leader of a large bureaucratic celestial ministry overseeing the maintenance of the Book of Life, a register of the due dates on which each and every human soul must be summoned before the Judges of Hell for judgement.

Thunder God 
In Chinese, he is known as Léigōng (雷公) or Léishén (雷神). Originally from Taoism, he is regarded as the god of thunder as well as a punisher of evil-doers who is feared as being particularly merciless towards those who oppress widows and orphans and those who kidnap children. His Buddhist iconographic form has been strongly influenced by that of Garuda from the Hindu pantheon to form a half-man and half-bird entity, bearing a pair of wings on his back and holding a hammer and a chisel in his hands as well as a sling of drums around his neck.

Literature 
The twenty-four deities are mentioned in the 16th century Ming dynasty novel Journey To The West (one of the Four Classic Chinese Novels) as attendants of the Bodhisattva Guanyin (the Chinese form of Avalokitesvara) who reside on her bodhimaṇḍa on the island of Mount Potalaka. In the novel, they serve as disciples who listen to Guanyin expound the Buddhist teachings as well as guardian protectors of her island.

Gallery

References 

Dharmapalas

Buddhist deities
Chinese deities
Chinese Buddhists